Chintz is a woodblock printed, painted, stained or glazed calico textile that originated in Golconda (present day Hyderabad, India) in the 16th century. The cloth is printed with designs featuring flowers and other patterns in different colours, typically on a light, plain background.

Name 
Since the 19th century the term has also been used for the style of floral decoration developed in those calico textiles, but then used more widely, for example on chintzware pottery and wallpaper. Chintz designs are derived from the style of Indian designs themselves reflecting Mughal art. A white base with floral and animal prints are its basic characteristics.

Unglazed calico was traditionally called "cretonne". The word calico is derived from the name of the Indian city Calicut (Kozhikkode in native Malayalam), to which it had a manufacturing association. In contemporary language, the words "chintz" and "chintzy" can be used to refer to clothing or furnishings which are vulgar or florid in appearance, and commonly in informal speech, to refer to cheap, low quality, or gaudy things, and similarly, to personal behavior.

The term 'chintzy' is also attributed to novelist George Eliot, who in 1851 wrote about muslin fabric to her sister, saying: "The quality of the spotted one is best, but the effect is chintzy." This is believed to have been said about cheap British imitations of real chintz, which became common at the time.

History

Chintz was originally a woodblock printed, painted or stained calico produced in Hyderabad, India from 1600 to 1800 and popular for bed covers, quilts and draperies. After Vasco da Gama successfully reached Calicut in India in 1498, the fabric became known in Europe. Around 1600, Portuguese and Dutch traders were bringing examples of Indian chintz into Europe on a small scale, but the English and French merchants began sending large quantities. By 1680 more than a million pieces of chintz were being imported into England per year, and a similar quantity was going to France and the Dutch Republic. These early imports were probably mostly used for curtains, furnishing fabrics, and bed hangings and covers (Samuel Pepys bought a set for his wife.) It has been suggested that wearing them as clothes began when these were replaced and given to maidservants, who made them into dresses, and also that they were first worn as linings.

With imported chintz becoming so popular with Europeans during the late 17th century, French and English mills grew concerned, as they did not know how to make chintz. In 1686 France declared a ban on all chintz imports. In 1720 the Parliament of Great Britain enacted a law that forbade "the Use and Warings in Apparel of imported chintz, and also its use or Wear in or about any Bed, Chair, Cushion or other Household furniture".

Spain followed England and France to ban calico imports. Firstly in 1717 Asian textiles were banned. Then in 1728 the import of European made imitations of Asian textiles was banned in Spain. Additionally the second edict had as one of its objectives to encourage a local, import-substituting weaving and printing industry in imitation of England.

Even though chintz was outlawed, there were loopholes in the legislation. The Court of Versailles was outside the law and fashionable young courtiers continued wearing chintz. In 1734, French naval officer M. de Beaulieu, who was stationed at Pondicherry, India, sent home letters along with actual samples of chintz fabric during each stage of the process to a chemist friend detailing the dyeing process of cotton chintz.

In 1742, another Frenchman, Father Coeurdoux, also supplied details of the chintz making process, while he was trying to convert the Indians to Catholicism. In 1759 the ban on chintz was lifted. By this time French and English mills were able to produce chintz.

Europeans at first produced reproductions of Indian designs, and later added original patterns. Eventually the word in English came to describe any industrially printed cotton. Modern chintz usually consists of bright overall floral patterns printed on a light background, but there are some popular patterns on black backgrounds as well.

Books 
Cloth that Changed the World is a book about chintz by Sarah Fee that explains the story of Indian chintz.

Gallery

See also 
 Peshgeer

References

External links

An exhibition of calico and chintz at the Smithsonian American Art Museum
Chintz Applique Quilts: From Imitation to Icon – Online exhibition at the International Quilt Study Center & Museum, University of Nebraska-Lincoln
On Chintz. An interview with chintz expert Rosemary Crill, senior curator at the Victoria and Albert Museum.

Industrial design
Printed fabrics
Painted fabrics
Hindi words and phrases
Indian inventions
Ornaments